Nuclear protein localization protein 4 homolog is a protein that in humans is encoded by the NPLOC4 gene.

Model organisms

Model organisms have been used in the study of NPLOC4 function. A conditional knockout mouse line, called Nploc4tm1a(EUCOMM)Wtsi was generated as part of the International Knockout Mouse Consortium program — a high-throughput mutagenesis project to generate and distribute animal models of disease to interested scientists — at the Wellcome Trust Sanger Institute.

Male and female animals underwent a standardized phenotypic screen to determine the effects of deletion. Twenty six tests were carried out and two phenotypes were reported. No homozygous mutant embryos were identified during gestation, and therefore none survived until weaning. The remaining tests were carried out on heterozygous mutant adult mice; no significant abnormalities were observed in these animals.

Interactions 

NPLOC4 has been shown to interact with UFD1L.

References

Further reading 

 
 
 

Genes mutated in mice